Eucalantica polita is a moth in the  family Yponomeutidae. It is found at the Pacific side of the coastal regions of Canada (British Columbia) and the United States (Washington, Oregon and California).

The length of the forewings is 5.5–8 mm.

The larvae feed on the flowers and leaves of Vaccinium ovatum and possibly Rhododendron pacificum. They are primarily external feeders which web amongst inflorescences or young vegetative terminals of their host plant.

References

Moths described in 1881
Yponomeutidae